Ida von Nagel (15 May 1917 – 29 August 1971) was a German equestrian and Olympic medalist. She won a bronze medal in dressage at the 1952 Summer Olympics in Helsinki.

References

1917 births
1971 deaths
German female equestrians
Olympic equestrians of Germany
Olympic bronze medalists for Germany
Equestrians at the 1952 Summer Olympics
Olympic medalists in equestrian
Medalists at the 1952 Summer Olympics